SM UC-25 was a German Type UC II minelaying submarine or U-boat in the German Imperial Navy during World War I. The U-boat was ordered on 29 August 1915 and was launched on 10 June 1916. She was commissioned into the German Imperial Navy on 28 June 1916 as SM UC-25. In 13 patrols UC-25 was credited with sinking 21 ships, either by torpedo or by mines laid. From March to September 1918, she was commanded by Karl Dönitz, later grand admiral in charge of all U-boats in World War II. UC-25 was scuttled at Pola on 28 October 1918 on the surrender of Austria-Hungary.

Design
A German Type UC II submarine, UC-25 had a displacement of  when at the surface and  while submerged. The submarine was powered by two six-cylinder four-stroke diesel engines each producing  (a total of ), two electric motors producing , and two propeller shafts.

UC-25 was fitted with six  mine tubes, eighteen UC 200 mines, three  torpedo tubes (one on the stern and two on the bow), seven torpedoes, and one  Uk L/30 deck gun. Her complement was twenty-six crew members.

Summary of raiding history

References

Notes

Citations

Bibliography

 
 

Ships built in Hamburg
German Type UC II submarines
U-boats commissioned in 1916
U-boats scuttled in 1918
Maritime incidents in 1918
World War I submarines of Germany
World War I minelayers of Germany
1916 ships